Mithinga Daimary (alias Deepak Das)  was the Central Publicity Secretary of the banned outfit ULFA since the previous publicity secretary Siddhartha Phukan's surrender in 1992. He was born in the Barama village in Nalbari district of Assam on 17 May 1967 with the birth name Deepak Kachari.

Education
Daimary joined B. Borooah College in Guwahati in 1986. But he could not complete his graduation since he joined ULFA in the same year and went underground. Later he became the Central Publicity Secretary of the outfit.

Arrest
He was captured by the Royal Bhutan Army during the Operation All Clear in December 2003. He was handed over by Bhutan to the Indian Army who in turn handed him over to Assam Police on 20 December 2003. ‘‘I will not surrender before the government and will fight to the end,’’ said Daimary in a show of defiance when produced before the Chief Judicial Magistrate of Nalbari. He further said that the Bhutanese operation was quite unexpected. He has now been released from jail for peace talks between the Government of India and the ULFA. Apurba Baruah became his successor after his arrest.

Poetry

Daimary wrote poetry under the pseudonym Megan Kachari and has three collections of it. In 2006, the World Book Fair in Frankfurt released an English translation of some of his poems. Melodies and Guns) is a collection of his poems published by UBSPD in response to the efforts taken by Jnanpith Awardee Mamoni Raisom Goswami. Memsahib Prithibi is the collection of his Assamese poetry now translated into English as "Melodies and Guns" by Pradeep Acharya and Manjeet Baruah. The preface of the book is written by Dr Goswami herself. He has been writing poetry since even before he joined ULFA in the 1980s. "While at the camp, he had a few birds as pets. On the night of the crackdown, when everyone was fleeing, he wanted to take them with him. On finding them asleep, he waited for them to wake up, but it was too late," said Dr Mamoni Raisom Goswami.

Family Assassination
In 2000 his entire family - mother, elder brother, sister, pregnant sister-in-law – was assassinated by unidentified gunman which is said to be a part of the Secret Killings that then AGP government allegedly carried out.

See also
List of top leaders of ULFA
Melodies and Guns
Operation All Clear
People's Consultative Group
Sanjukta Mukti Fouj

References

Writers from Northeast India
People from Nalbari district
ULFA members
Living people
Prisoners and detainees from Assam
1967 births
Assamese-language poets
Indian people imprisoned abroad
Prisoners and detainees of Bhutan
Poets from Assam
20th-century Indian poets